Luo Youjia (born 1977-09-13 in Dongfang, Hainan) is a male Chinese sports sailor who competed for Team China at the 2008 Summer Olympics.

Luo Youjia's English name is Jacky.

Major performances

1997/2005 National Games - 8th/7th 470 class

References
 http://2008teamchina.olympic.cn/index.php/personview/personsen/5142

1977 births
Living people
Chinese male sailors (sport)
Olympic sailors of China
Sportspeople from Hainan
Sailors at the 2008 Summer Olympics – Tornado
People from Dongfang